William Watkiss Lloyd (11 March 1813 – 22 December 1893) was an English writer with wide interests. These included fine art, architecture, archaeology, Shakespeare, and classical and modern languages and literature.

Life
Lloyd was born at Homerton, then in Middlesex, and educated at Newcastle-under-Lyme High School. At the age of 15 he entered a family tobacco business in London, where he remained until his retirement in 1864. In 1868 he married Ellen Brooker Beale (died 1900). He died in London.

Works
The work for which Lloyd is best known is The Age of Pericles (1875), which is notable for its scholarship and appreciation of its period, but hampered by a difficult and at times obscure style. He also wrote:
Xanthian Marbles (1845)
Critical Essays upon Shakespeare's Plays (1875)
Christianity in the Cartoons [of Raphael] (1865), which excited considerable attention from the way in which theological questions were discussed.
The History of Sicily to the Athenian War with elucidations of the Sicilian odes of Pindar (1872)
Panics and their Panaceas (1869)
An edition of Much Ado about Nothing, "now first published in fully recovered metrical form" (1884) – the author held that all the plays were originally written throughout in blank verse.

A number of his manuscripts remain unpublished. The most important of these were bequeathed to the British Museum, including:
A Further History of Greece
The Century of Michael Angelo
The Neo-Platonists
These are discussed in a "Memoir" by Sophia Beale, prefixed to Lloyd's posthumously published Elijah Fenton: his Poetry and Friends (1894), which contains a list of his published and unpublished works.

References

1813 births
1893 deaths
People educated at Newcastle-under-Lyme School